WSNJ (1240 kHz) is a commercial AM radio station licensed to Bridgeton, New Jersey.  It is owned by SNJ Today, LLC, and it airs a full-service adult contemporary radio format, featuring hits from the 1980s, 90s and early 2000s.

WSNJ is powered at 1,000 watts and its transmitter is off South Burlington Road in Upper Deerfield Township.  WSNJ is also heard on two FM translators, one broadcasting on 99.9 FM and one on 105.7 FM.

History
In August 1937, WSNJ signed on the air.  It was owned by Eastern States Broadcasting and was powered at only 100 watts.  For a time it broadcast on 1210 kilocycles.  In 1941, it moved to its current frequency at 1240 kHz.  It got a boost in power to 250 watts.

In the 2010s, WSNJ signed on its first FM translator, W260BW, on 99.9 FM in Bridgeton, New Jersey, which has since moved to Swedesboro, New Jersey and has increased its power and height.  In 2018, WSNJ signed on its second FM translator, W260DK (now W289CY), in Milmay, New Jersey. W260BW is heard in Salem County and Gloucester County.  W289CY is heard in Cumberland County and Atlantic County.

On June 4, 2020, 1240 AM and 99.9 FM rebranded to "POP FM 99.9", still retaining its full-service classic hits and adult contemporary format; "POP" is an acronym for "Power of Positivity".

Translators

References

External links
WSNJ official website

SNJ
Mainstream adult contemporary radio stations in the United States